The Hermitage Volunteer Service of the State Hermitage Museum in Saint Petersburg, Russia is an organisation of volunteers that unites foreign and Russian students with the goal of providing assistance to this world-renowned museum. The program aids the Hermitage with its external and internal activities and functions as an informal link between the museum staff and the public, making the knowledge of the museum's experts accessible to the general community. Volunteers also develop projects reflecting their own personal goals and interests in connection with the museum.

Mission
The mission statement of the Hermitage Volunteer Service is "Fostering a sense of responsibility for the preservation of cultural heritage." The principal mission of the Volunteer Service is to acquaint young people with international culture and heritage through access to the Hermitage's extensive international collections. The volunteer program aims to help younger generations understand the value of tradition and to instill in them a feeling of responsibility for its preservation. The Volunteer Service involves young students in various cultural projects, many of which are directly linked to various museum activities.

History
Shortly before the celebration of the 300th anniversary of Saint Petersburg, Mikhail Kozhukhovskij approached the Hermitage Administration and proposed to create a volunteer service to help the organisation of the tricentennial activities. At the same time, he began to search for individuals with experience in the creation of educational programs who were interested in being part of such a project. Due to his efforts, the Hermitage was able to choose from among a group of 150 individuals prepared to help. On 23 May 2003 a group of volunteers wearing red uniforms entered the Hermitage for the first time and began to assist in any way they could. Kozhukovskij was assigned to head this new Volunteer Service. While still in its infancy, the program created many projects in collaboration with various departments of the Hermitage, which allowed volunteers to become an integral part of the museum's staff.

The team
The program is continually renewed through a constant flow of new volunteers of diverse background; students and workers, Russians and foreigners, young and old work together for the general improvement of the Hermitage. Currently volunteers involved with the program come from all over the world including Russia, Switzerland, the United States, Germany, France, Spain, Italy, Poland, Romania, Turkey, Lebanon, Brazil, Korea, Ireland, and other countries. Each volunteer devotes time to the program according to their individual schedules and skills. They include linguists, art historians, journalists, teachers, computer scientists, and individuals from other professions not necessarily linked to the cultural sphere. For instance, the volunteer service includes a bus driver, an arachnologist, and a dancer. After Hermitage volunteers leave the Service, many keep in touch with the program and its other members. In this way, the volunteer program has established an extensive international network of contacts.

Awards 
On  November 23, 2013, the government of Saint Petersburg's Council for Youth Politics organised a celebration in honour of the State Hermitage Museum's volunteer program in the atrium of the museum. The celebration's main goal was to promote the museum's young volunteer movement and raise awareness for the volunteer's activities and projects among the citizens, authorities and companies.
Among the 150 organisations participating in the competition, the best were awarded honorary diplomas and prizes. As a competitor in the competition for “Most Effective Volunteer Program”, the State Hermitage won the award in the category “Execution of Municipal Events”. 
An honorary diploma and the bronze statue of the “Little Prince” were awarded to the volunteer program's coordinator Mikhail Kozhukhovskij.

Activities
Below are some examples of the activities in which members of the program may participate:
 Reception and security: Welcoming and assisting Hermitage visitors, checking tickets and providing information
 Helping with scientific projects: Typing of museum inventories, conservation-restoration, archaeological excavations, classification and management of stored artifacts
 Preparing museum publications and correspondence
 Developing new communication technology and creating designs for multi-media projects
 Helping to organize seminars and international conferences
 Translation work
 Teaching foreign languages and creating conversation groups
 Helping to move artifacts and exhibitions

Projects

WHY (World Heritage & Youth)
World Heritage & Youth (WHY) is the flagship project of the Volunteer Service. Its main goal is to bring into focus the importance of tradition. This project involves volunteers in various programs and conferences concerning cultural preservation. One example of the sort of issues tackled by the WHY project is the debate regarding the construction of the Okhta Center, one of the most criticized building projects proposed in contemporary Saint Petersburg. Many volunteers have reacted negatively to its potential construction. Stressing the importance of preserving the historic center of Saint Petersburg, the program is actively involved in the discussion surrounding this controversial project.

The Summer University of the State Hermitage Museum is the direct result of the WHY project. Since 2009, the Volunteer Service has organized the Summer University each July in collaboration with the Russian company Rosatom. Students, often from remote areas of Russia, are invited to participate in a series of events and activities designed to educate them about cultural tradition. For many of them, the Summer University is the first opportunity to discover and to explore the notion of cultural heritage. The Volunteer Service organizes various activities in conjunction with this programme.

Project Ropsha
Project Ropsha was the first project created by the Volunteer Service. The city of Ropsha, located southwest of Saint Petersburg, is the site of a palace included in UNESCO’s World Heritage List. Hermitage volunteers took part in a campaign to stop the destruction of this monument. They started by gathering information about the location, and then created a unique archive. The project involved the creation of the Christmas Tree Museum at the site of the palace, which helps the children of the city to understand this almost universal holiday tradition.

Games, quests, and contests
Every year the Volunteer Service organizes games conquests and activities for school-aged children and students. For example, in one fun and interesting game, students can get acquainted with the pages of world history and culture. It is a fascinating journey through the halls of the museum in search of unusual treasures and exhibits. The aim is to present world history on a level easily understood by children. Each game focuses on a particular aspect of history, cultural heritage, or tradition. In February 2009 the Service created a game called The Day of the Scythians which helped children not only discover the ancient Scythians, but also the nomads of the rich Pazyryk culture.

The Service also organizes educational contests developed through collaboration with schools as part of their academic programs. Various Hermitage departments are also involved in this kind of activity. When visiting the thematic excursions and engaging in some investigations, students can discover a wonderful world of history and culture.

Games and quests organized by the Volunteer Service of the Hermitage:
 Gods. Stars. Planets Quest, April 12, 2017.
 Discover your Europe in the Hermitage Kinoquest, September 24 - end of 2016.
 Legends of Space Quest, April 12, 2016.
 Discover your Europe in the Hermitage Quest, September 2015.
 Discover your Europe in the HermitageQuest, September 2013.
 Discover your Europe in the Hermitage Quest, September 2012.
 Volunteer Games 2010, April 2010.
 KotoVasiya KotoManiya Quest, March 2009.
 Volunteer Games 2009, April 2009.
 Day of the Scythians Game, April 2009.
 Indiana Jones in the Hermitage Game, November 2008.

Computer Graphics and Animation Contests 
Since 2005 the Volunteer Service of the State Hermitage has been hosting contests for students in the field of information technology. Every year the Volunteer Service develops and organizes contests with the NMO "School Center." The theme of the contest depends on the Hermitage Museum exhibitions and events. The contest includes special educational programs for participants aged 6 to 17 years, a staff of volunteers and informatics teachers, and an official awards ceremony. The types of competition entries include animations, multimedia performances, and computer arts. The winning entries are displayed on monitors in the halls of the Museum.

The contests held by the Volunteer Service of the State Hermitage:
 Hermitage: Preserving the Heritage of Nations, September - December 2018.
 The Hermitage and the Russian Ballet, March - May 2018.
 The Hermitage in Transition Era, October - December 2015.
 Tour de France 1717. Great journey of Peter the Great, February - May 2017.
 Byzantium and Russia, September - December 2016.
 Palmyra: Breathing Life!, March - May 2015.
 Buenos Dias, Argentina, September - December 2015.
 The Frog-traveler, April–November 2015.
 Birth of the Hermitage, December 2014 - April 2015.
 The Fabulous World We Dream Away..., December 2012.
 Cats - big and small, April 2012.
 9 days before the Calends of September, December 2011.
 The Garage of Nicholas II in the Winter Palace, February 2011.
 ...On the Threshold of Discovery, October 2010.
 On The Trail of the Olympian Gods, April 2010.
 Autograph of St. Petersburg, May 2009.
 Multicat 2009, March 2009.
 New Year's Eve, December 2007.
 History of the Christmas Tree, December 2005.

References

External links
 
 The Hermitage Museum
 The Project WHY
 The Rosatom and the Volunteer Service

Hermitage Museum
Culture in Saint Petersburg
International volunteer organizations